Phil Mealey is a British actor and writer from Stockport.

Biography
Mealey co-wrote and associate-produced the BBC sitcom Early Doors with Craig Cash. Mealey also acted in the series, playing the character Duffy. Cash and Mealey won two North West Comedy Awards in 2005 for the writing and acting on the series.

Mealey also co-wrote some episodes of the BBC's sitcom series titled The Royle Family, along with Cash and Caroline Aherne.

His most recent role was in Sunshine which he also co-wrote with Cash.

References

External links

British male television actors
Living people
Year of birth missing (living people)